Magdalena Ewa Tul (born 29 April 1980) is a Polish singer and composer. In 2000 she moved from Gdańsk to Warsaw where she started working as a singer and actress for Studio Buffo, a musical theater. She performed there as a lead singer in Metro. Three years later, she started working with another musical theater, Roma. She performed there in the musicals Miss Saigon, Grease, Cats and Academy of Mister Kleks.

Early life and career
At age 12, Tul participated in a local children's band which eventually led to her interest in music. She was shortlisted during the Polish pre-selection for the Eurovision Song Contest 2005. Six years later, on 14 February 2011, she was chosen to represent Poland at the Eurovision Song Contest 2011 with her entry, "Jestem". She did not reach the finals, having come last in the semi-finals in 19th position.

In 2012, she sent in a song for the Swiss selection in the Eurovision Song Contest 2013 in Malmö, Sweden. The song's title was "Give It Up" but she didn't reach the final. She returned to the contest in 2014 as a jury member.

In 2013, she became a contestant on The Voice of Poland.

In June 2014, she released "Brave".

In June 2019, she released "Mindfulness" her latest album.

Discography

Albums

Extended plays

Singles

See also

Poland in the Eurovision Song Contest 2011

References

External links

Official website

1980 births
Living people
Eurovision Song Contest entrants of 2011
Musicians from Gdańsk
Eurovision Song Contest entrants for Poland
Polish pop singers
English-language singers from Poland
Kazimierz Wielki University in Bydgoszcz alumni
21st-century Polish singers
21st-century Polish women singers